Dugald A. Steer B.A. (Brist), S.A.S.D. (born 1965) is an English children's writer.

Biography

Early life and education
Dugald Steer was born in 1965 and grew up in Surrey. He completed a Bachelor of Arts, majoring in English literature and philosophy at Bristol University, then completed a TEFL course and lived in Spain for five years.

Career
After returning to the United Kingdom, Steer got a job with Templar Publishing, working his way up to become senior editor. At Templar, he wrote and edited many books, including numerous Ologies. He has since gone freelance in order to pursue writing for children and teaching.

Published works
Steer has authored over 100 books, beginning with Big Bear and the Missing Mouse (1995). Other notable works of his include Mythical Mazes, Scary Fairies, An Accidental Christmas, Just One More Story, The Night Tiger, Dragonology, The Dragonology Chronicles: The Dragon's Eye, The Dragonology Chronicles: The Dragon Diary, The Dragonology Chronicles: The Dragon's Apprentice and The Dragonology Chronicles: The Dragon Prophecy.

Bibliography
 Dragonology: The Complete Book of Dragons (2003) (Illustrated by Helen Ward, Wayne Anderson, Nghiem Ta, Chris Forsey, A. J. Wood, and Douglas Carrel)
 Egyptology: Search for the Tomb of Osiris (2004) (Illustrated by Nghiem Ta, Ian P. Andrew, Nick Harris, and Helen Ward)
 Wizardology: The Book of the Secrets of Merlin (2005) (Illustrated by Nghiem Ta, Anne Yvonne Gilbert, John Howe, Tomislav Tomic, and Helen Ward)
 Pirateology: A Pirate Hunter's Companion (2006) (Illustrated by Nghiem Ta, Ian Andrew, Anne Yvonne Gilbert, Helen Ward, G. Hunt, R. Sella, and Carole Thomann)
 Drake's Comprehensive Compendium of Dragonology (2009) (Illustrated by Nghiem Ta, J. P. Lambert, A. J. Wood, Douglas Carrel, Tomislav Tomic, Nick Harris, Wayne Anderson, and Helen Ward)

References

1965 births
Living people
Alumni of the University of Bristol
English children's writers
People from Surrey
English male short story writers
English short story writers